Camila Romero (born 5 October 1998) is an Ecuadorian tennis player.

Romero has a career high WTA singles ranking of 917, achieved on 16 September 2019. She also has a career high WTA doubles ranking of 875, achieved on 5 August 2019. Romero has won one ITF doubles title.

Romero represents Ecuador in the Fed Cup.

ITF Circuit finals

Doubles: 3 (2 titles, 1 runners–up)

References

External links
 
 
 

1998 births
Living people
Ecuadorian female tennis players
Sportspeople from Guayaquil
Oklahoma Sooners women's tennis players
South American Games medalists in tennis
South American Games bronze medalists for Ecuador
Competitors at the 2018 South American Games
20th-century Ecuadorian women
21st-century Ecuadorian women